Svenska kraftnät is an electricity transmission system operator in Sweden. It is a state-owned public utility, which was created in 1992 by splitting the former government agency Vattenfall into a power generation and distribution company Vattenfall AB and a transmission company Svenska kraftnät. The company has its headquarters in Sundbyberg, near Stockholm in Sweden.

Svenska kraftnät owns 28% of Nord Pool along with other Nordic and Baltic transmission system operators.

See also

Electricity sector in Sweden
European Network of Transmission System Operators for Electricity
ebiX

References

External links
 

Government-owned companies of Sweden
Electric power transmission system operators in Sweden
Companies based in Stockholm County